SS Van Heemskerk was a freighter built by N.V. Nederlandsche Scheepsbouw-Maatschappij with engines built by Nederlandsche Fabriek van Werktuigen & Spoorwegmaterieel N.V, both of Amsterdam, Netherlands.

During World War I Van Heemskerk, then at Singapore, came under the Shipping Controller, London for wartime operation by British India Steam Navigation Co. Ltd., London until returned to KPM in 1919.

Van Heemskerk was one of twenty-one KPM vessels that took refuge in Australian ports after the fall of Java that Dutch officials requested be put into service for the war effort. The ship, among others, was chartered by the Chief Quartermaster, U.S. Army Forces in Australia (USAFIA) on 26 March 1942 with long term details to be negotiated at higher levels to become part of the U.S. Army's local fleet crewed by its KPM officers and men without an Army local fleet "X" number being assigned.

The ship continued transporting troops and materiel between Australia and New Guinea during the reinforcement and build up in New Guinea. On December 26 and 27, while at Merauke, New Guinea, the ship was bombed by a Japanese float plane suffering seven casualties.

Logistical support of Allied offensive operations on the north coast of New Guinea by sea required establishment of a port west of Milne Bay at Oro Bay and a route by which large ships could pass through the largely uncharted and hazardous waters between. Small vessels transporting supplies in the early stages and survey vessels found that route and convoys code named Operation Lilliput were put into place to run two large ships under escort of one or two corvettes to Oro Bay in what were termed "flights" and given numbers. Van Heemskerk took part in a simultaneous, specialized operation code named Accountant that was to transport the United States Army 162nd Regiment, 41st Division, from Australia to the Buna-Gona operations area. The ship was then to join the regular Lilliput convoy system as flight number 28.

Loss
The ship discharged the embarked troops but still had cargo of ammunition and fuel to be unloaded and not enough time to clear the bay. The U.S. troop commander left an improvised defense of twenty U.S. soldiers who placed a jeep with mounted .50 caliber machine gun on each hatch for defense until, after surviving four masthead level attacks, a hit in a hold containing ammunition and fuel destroyed the jeeps and crews. Loss of Van Heemskerk caused the only cancellation of a Lilliput flight with 39 of 40 being completed.

References
Notes

Bibliography

External links
 De werf van de Nederlandsche Scheepsbouw Maatschappij, Conradstraat 151 (Photo of Van Heemskerk under construction)
 Tewaterlating van het vrachtpassagiersschip ss. Van Heemskerk (Photo of Van Heemskerk on ways)

1909 ships
Ships built by Nederlandsche Scheepsbouw Maatschappij
Merchant ships of the Netherlands
World War II merchant ships of the Netherlands
Ships sunk by Japanese aircraft
Maritime incidents in April 1943
Shipwrecks of Papua New Guinea
Merchant ships sunk by aircraft